Nathaniel Freeman (March 28, 1741 – September 20, 1827) was an American physician and jurist. He was a brigadier general during the American Revolutionary War and a member of the Massachusetts House of Representatives in 1775.

Biography 
Nathaniel Freeman born in Dennis, Barnstable County, Massachusetts in 1741. He settled at Sandwich (also Barnstable County) in 1763 where he established a medical practice. He also studied law.

In 1773, Freeman became chairman of the Committee of Correspondence of Safety of Sandwich. In September of 1774 he was chosen the leader of a mass protest against the British "Intolerable Acts," which won the agreement of county officials to ignore the requirements of Parliament's new legislation. The following year was elected a member of the Massachusetts House of Representatives and was appointed colonel of a militia regiment.

Freeman served during the American Revolutionary War, commanding a militia regiment in the Rhode Island expedition, and from 1781 to 1791 he was brigadier general of militia. He was also a judge of probate and of the Court of Common Pleas.

In 1814, Freeman was elected a member of the American Antiquarian Society

References 

 

This article incorporates text from The History of Medicine in the United States (1901) which is in the public domain.

External links 
Nathaniel Freeman Papers at The University of Michigan
 

1741 births
1827 deaths
Massachusetts militiamen in the American Revolution
Members of the Massachusetts House of Representatives
Militia generals in the American Revolution
People from Dennis, Massachusetts
American judges
People from Sandwich, Massachusetts
Members of the American Antiquarian Society